Mohammad Sultan (23 December 1918 – 1971) was an Afghan field hockey player who competed at the 1936 Summer Olympic Games, playing in both of his team's games.

References

External links
 

Afghan male field hockey players
Olympic field hockey players of Afghanistan
Field hockey players at the 1936 Summer Olympics
1918 births
1971 deaths